Jan Coelenbier (1610, Kortrijk – 1680, Haarlem), was a Dutch Golden Age landscape painter.

Biography
According to the RKD he was a pupil of Pieter de Molijn and became a member of the Haarlem Guild of St. Luke in 1632. He married in 1638 and is mentioned in archives as a merchant in 1675 and 1676. He is known for landscapes in the manner  of Jan van Goyen.

He was listed as coming from Utrecht and being a pupil of Van Goyen, "whose works he imitated so closely that they passed for the originals", in Bryan's Dictionary of Painters and Engravers.

Notes

References
Jan Coelenbier on Artnet
Attribution:
 

1610 births
1680 deaths
Artists from Haarlem
People from Kortrijk
Dutch Golden Age painters
Dutch male painters
Dutch landscape painters
Painters from Haarlem